Neutrophil collagenase, also known as matrix metalloproteinase-8 (MMP-8) or PMNL collagenase (MNL-CL), is a  collagen cleaving enzyme which is present in the connective tissue of most mammals.  In humans, the MMP-8 protein is encoded by the MMP8 gene.
The gene is part of a cluster of MMP genes which localize to chromosome 11q22.3. Most MMP's are secreted as inactive proproteins which are activated when cleaved by extracellular proteinases. However, the enzyme encoded by this gene is stored in secondary granules within neutrophils and is activated by autolytic cleavage.

Function 

Proteins of the matrix metalloproteinase (MMP) family are involved in the breakdown of extracellular matrix in normal physiological processes, such as embryonic development, reproduction, and tissue remodeling, as well as in disease processes, such as arthritis and metastasis. The primary function of MMP-8 is the degradation of type I, II and III collagens. 
In cancer, loss of MMP-8 in the murine MMTV-PyMT breast cancer model has been associated with increased tumor growth and metastatic burden, as well as enhanced tumor vascularity and altered immune cell infiltration. Furthermore, analysis of MMP-8 in breast cancer cell lines revealed a causal connection between MMP-8 activity and IL6 and IL8 production, suggesting a role for MMP-8 in the regulation of the innate immune system.

References

Further reading

External links
 The MEROPS online database for peptidases and their inhibitors: M10.002

Matrix metalloproteinases
EC 3.4.24